Destination Hotels is a privately held lodging management company headquartered in Englewood, Colorado. It is the United States' largest independent hospitality management company, representing 40 luxury and upscale hotels, resorts and golf clubs internationally.

The collection includes a mix of mountain, beach and city properties across the United States and Scotland.

History
Destination Hotels began in 1972 (as Destination Hotels & Resorts) with the opening of The Gant in Aspen, one of the first condominium resort properties in the United States to offer contemporary hotel services such as concierge and front desk. 

Destination Hotels was a subsidiary of Lowe Hospitality Group (LHG), which is owned by Lowe Enterprises, a privately held national real estate investment, management and development firm headquartered in Los Angeles, California until October 2018. The company partners with affiliate Lowe Destination Development, also an LHG subsidiary, to development hospitality projects including both hotels and resort residential communities. LDD hotel and resort projects are managed by Destination Hotels upon completion.

In January, 2016, Destination Hotels merged with Commune Hotels. 

In October, 2018, Hyatt Hotels & Resorts purchased Two Road Hospitality which owned Destination Hotels at the time.

Locations and properties
The company's portfolio features 21 golf courses, 20 full-service spas, six IACC certified conference centers, and 110 bars and restaurants located in key states. On 5th October 2022, a new addition was announced, the first property outside of the US, in the Scottish Borders. The properties include:
Arizona
Tempe Mission Palms Hotel & Conference Center - Tempe, AZ
The Scottsdale Resort at McCormick Ranch - Scottsdale, AZ
California
Terranea Resort (opened 2009, redeveloped from Marineland of the Pacific, 1954–1987) - Rancho Palos Verdes, CA
Miramonte Resort & Spa -Indian Wells, CA
L'Auberge Del Mar Resort & Spa - Del Mar, CA
Paradise Point Resort & Spa - San Diego, CA
Town and Country San Diego - San Diego, CA
Hotel De Anza - San Jose, CA
Resort at Squaw Creek - Olympic Valley, CA
Colorado
The Inverness Hotel & Conference Center - Englewood, CO
The Stonebridge Inn - Snowmass Village, CO
Christiania Loge - Vail, CO
Vail Cascade Condominiums - Vail, CO
Destination Residences Snowmass - Snowmass Village, CO
Destination Resorts Vail - Vail, CO
Manor Vail Lodge - Vail, CO
The Gant - Aspen, CO
Florida
Yve Hotel Miami - Miami, FL
Hawaii
Wailea Beach Villas - Wailea, HI
Destination Residences Hawaii - Wailea, HI
Louisiana
The Royal St. Charles Hotel - New Orleans, LA
New Mexico
Inn and Spa at Loretto - Santa Fe, NM
New York
Tarrytown House Estate & Conference Center - Tarrytown, NY
North Carolina
The Carolina Inn - Chapel Hill, NC
Rizzo Center - Chapel Hill, NC
Oregon
Sunriver Resort - Sunriver, OR
South Carolina
Wild Dunes Resort - Isle of Palms, SC
Texas
Hotel Derek - Houston, TX
La Cantera Hill Country Resort - San Antonio, TX
Utah
Newpark Resort - Park City, UT
Vermont
Stowe Mountain Lodge - Stowe, VT
Virginia
Lansdowne Resort - Leesburg, VA
Quirk Hotel - Richmond, VA
Washington
Woodmark Hotel & Still Spa - Kirkland, WA
Skamania Lodge - Stevenson, WA
Motif Seattle - Seattle, WA
Suncadia Resort - Cle Elum, WA
Washington D.C.
The Embassy Row Hotel
Scotland
Schloss Roxburghe Hotel and Golf Course - Kelso, Scottish Borders

References

External links
Destination Hotels
Lowe Hospitality Group

Hospitality companies of the United States
Companies based in Denver
Lowe Enterprises
Hotels established in 1972
1972 establishments in Colorado